Kung Mawawala Ka (International title: A World Without You / ) is a Philippine television drama romance series broadcast by GMA Network. Directed by Joel Lamangan, Soxie Topacio and Argel Joseph, it stars Sunshine Dizon and Cogie Domingo. It premiered on April 8, 2002 on the network's Telebabad line up. The series concluded on June 6, 2003 with a total of 298 episodes. It was replaced by Narito ang Puso Ko in its timeslot.

Cast and characters

Lead cast
 Sunshine Dizon as Rosa Camilla Montemayor
 Cogie Domingo as Carlito Valiente

Supporting cast
 Eddie Garcia as Leandro Montemayor
 Liza Lorena as Iluminada Montemayor
 Gloria Diaz as Czarina Montemayor
 Hilda Koronel as Alicia Montemayor
 Sharmaine Arnaiz as Amanda Montemayor
 Raymond Bagatsing as Alberto Montemayor
 Princess Punzalan as Ernestina Montemayor
 Alessandra de Rossi as Paloma Montemayor
 Ara Mina as Lucinda Montemayor

Recurring cast
 Armida Siguion-Reyna as Romina Salgado
 Vic Vargas as Carlos Valiente
 Marianne dela Riva as Cynthia Valiente
 Iza Calzado as Phoebe Tuazon
 Maybeline Dela Cruz as Guadalupe Valiente
 Daniel Fernando as Alegre
 Eddie Gutierrez as Tomas Locsin 
 Tony Mabesa as Asturias
 Jay Manalo as Nestor Adorable
 Spanky Manikan as Gonzalo
 Jim Pebanco as Emil
 Miko Sotto as Dindo
 Jomari Yllana as Rafael
 Malou Crisologo as Elaine
 Daisy Reyes as Clarissa Rosales
 Angie Castrence as Angie
 Lara Fabregas as Marla Gatchalian
 Ryan Ramos as Jonathan Quirino
 Gardo Versoza as Edmund Amparo
 JJ Zamora as Charlie Valiente

References

External links
 

2002 Philippine television series debuts
2003 Philippine television series endings
Filipino-language television shows
GMA Network drama series
Philippine romance television series
Television shows set in the Philippines